Sandra Benitez (born March 26, 1941 in Washington D.C.) is an American novelist.

Life
Sandra Benitez was born in Washington D.C. and spent ten years of her childhood in El Salvador while her father was based there as a diplomat. She attended high school in Missouri from age 14 and subsequently graduated with a B.S. (1962) and M.A. (1974) from Northeast Missouri State University.

In 1997 she was selected as the University of Minnesota Edelstein-Keller Distinguished Writer in Residence. In 1998 she did the Writers Community Residency for the YMCA National Writer’s Voice program. In the spring of 2001 she held the Knapp Chair in Humanities as Associate Professor of Creative Writing at the University of San Diego.

Awards
 2004 Hispanic Heritage Award for Literature.
 2006 United States Artists Gund Fellow
 1998 American Book Award, for Bitter Grounds

Works

Anthologies

References

External links
"Author Interview: Sandra Benitez", Book Browse

American women novelists
20th-century American novelists
21st-century American novelists
American expatriates in El Salvador
Writers from Washington, D.C.
1941 births
Living people
University of Minnesota faculty
University of San Diego faculty
20th-century American women writers
21st-century American women writers
American Book Award winners
Novelists from Minnesota
American women academics